Aslan Baladze (born 5 June 1960) is a retired Georgian football international player and current manager. Baladze spent most of his player and coaching career at Dinamo Batumi. currently, he is serving in Batumi City Assembly. he was elected in 2021. he is a member of the Georgian Dream party.

References

External links
 
 
 

1960 births
Living people
People from Kobuleti
Footballers from Georgia (country)
Association football goalkeepers
Georgia (country) international footballers
Erovnuli Liga players
FC Dinamo Tbilisi players
FC Dinamo Batumi players
Football managers from Georgia (country)
FC Dinamo Batumi managers